Peter Kenney Hibbs (c. 1757 – 12 September 1847) was an English mariner and a member of the First Fleet to Australia in 1788.

Hibbs also claimed to have come earlier to Australia in 1770 as a crewman on board HMS Endeavour with Captain James Cook, and to have stepped ashore at Botany Bay with Joseph Banks. However no primary independent evidence exists to verify these claims.

Remaining in Australia after 1788, Hibbs played a significant role in the exploration of Tasmania and the eastern seaboard of Australia. 
 In 1798-99, as master (captain) of the colonial built Norfolk, and chosen by his previous master (captain) of HMS Sirius, John Hunter, who was now governor of New South Wales, Hibbs commanded the first vessel to circumnavigate Van Dieman’s Land (Tasmania). This voyage proved that Tasmania was an island and proved the existence of Bass Strait. The discovery of the Bass Straight shortened the travel distance from England to Sydney, as previously the ships had sailed to the south of Tasmania.
 In 1799, as master of the colonial built Norfolk, and chosen by his previous master of HMS Sirius, John Hunter, who was now governor of New South Wales, Hibbs commanded the first vessel to sail north from Port Jackson (Sydney) to explore and chart Moreton Bay and Hervey Bay.

In the 1798-99 voyage around Tasmania, Hibbs had been carrying  Matthew Flinders and George Bass aboard the Norfolk, and in the 1799 voyage north Hibbs had been carrying Matthew Finders. Flinders named a cluster of features on the west coast of Tasmania after Hibbs.

Hibbs also claimed to have taken part in an earlier expedition in 1789 led by Governor Arthur Phillip which resulted in the discovery of the Hawkesbury River. Again no primary independent evidence exists to verify this claim.

Named in his honour
On 11 December 1798, as the Norfolk sailed south down the west coast during the successful circumnavigation of Tasmania, Matthew Flinders named a number of coastal features after Hibbs:
Hibbs Bay, a bay on the western coast of Tasmania south of Macquarie Harbour
Hibbs Lagoon, a lagoon on the northern shore of Hibbs Bay
Hibbs River, a river flowing into Hibbs Lagoon and then discharging into Hibbs Bay
Hibbs Pyramid, a pyramid shaped island in southern Hibbs Bay
Point Hibbs, a headland at the southern extremity of Hibbs Bay

"Bass and Flinders named all kinds of geographical features in their own names on their trip around Tasmania.  Peter Hibbs was the only other person after whom they named several Tasmanian geographical features - apart from a couple in honour of Peter’s wife, Mary."

Birth and baptism
Peter, the son of Mary Kenney, was thought to have been born in England in about 1757 at Ramsgate, Kent. Mary Kenney and George Hibbs had married on 25 December 1760, at the parish church of St Laurence-in-Thanet, Ramsgate,. Previously Peter was not thought to be a son of George Hibbs, a native of Swanage, a seaside town in Dorset, and that he was raised as George Hibbs' son. However it is now considered that Peter was a biological son of George Hibbs, as DNA test results of his descendants have shown matches with other Hibbs descendants, including in the UK. The family moved the more than 200 miles (320 km) back to Swanage. On 24 January 1762, Peter was baptized at the parish church of St Mary the Virgin, Swanage, as Peter Kennel [sic] Hibbs, the son of George and Mary Hibbs.

Mollie Gillen has suggested that Hibbs was five years younger than this, born about 1762 at Ramsgate, a date which is based upon his baptism at Swanage, after the marriage of Mary Kenney and George Hibbs.

Cabin boy on HMB Endeavour in 1770?
Hibbs' gravestone indicates that he was born in about 1757. This would have made him about 11 years of age on 26 August 1768 when HMS Endeavour sailed from England on its voyage of discovery. In the 18th century the Royal Navy encouraged boys as young as nine years of age to enlist as "servants," with the lower age not being raised to thirteen until 1794. Cabin boys performed a variety of functions such as errand boys, servants to officers, mess attendants, and on armed vessels as powder monkeys. However they were also apprentice seamen "learning the ropes" (literally) as they underwent sail training on the rigging. Stephen Yarrow states that since they were under-age, their names were often not recorded.

Hibbs maintained during his life-time that he had first come to Australia with Captain Cook in 1770.
Hibbs also maintained that on 28 April 1770 when Joseph Banks had set off in a boat in Botany Bay in search for water and to explore the coast, that, following the distinguished naturalist, Hibbs had been the second person to jump ashore. These claims were repeated in the newspaper the Windsor and Richmond Gazette of 3 May 1890 on the death of his son Peter Kenney Hibbs Jnr.

No evidence exists to support Hibbs' claim that he was the second person to step ashore in Botany Bay.

Stephen Yarrow maintains, however, that secondary independent evidence does exist to support Hibbs' claim to have been aboard HMS Endeavour. Stephen Yarrow maintains that in a report on the First Fleet, Arthur Phillip recorded that Hibbs had been especially chosen to join the crew of HMS Sirius because Hibbs "had previously visited these shores". The only ship to have "previously visited these shores" was HMS Endeavour.

Able seaman on HMS Sirius 1787-1790
Hibbs naval record commences on 24 August 1786 when he was appointed as an able seaman aboard the 74-gun battleship HMS Goliath. On 25 March 1787 Hibbs was transferred to the 10-gun HMS Sirius. (HMS Sirius was armed with six carronades, short cannons used to fire large objects to smash ships. She also had four six-pounder guns. There were another ten six-pounder guns in the cargo hold to be used to protect the new settlement.)

HMS Sirius was the flagship of the First Fleet.
<blockquote>HMS Sirius was never meant to be the Flagship of the First Fleet bound for Botany Bay. One moment she was the Berwick';, a burnt out hulk bought by the Royal Navy, fitted out "with refuse of the yard", renamed Sirius and next she found herself leading the First Fleet out of Portsmouth Harbour with the newly appointed Governor and Captain of the Flagship - Arthur Phillip.
</blockquote>
Allen Maunder in his book Sailing on...The Hibbs Line describes the difficulty of the voyage:Imagine going around Cape Horn [sic] on a Sydney Harbour Ferry packed with one hundred and sixty men, bulls, cows, horses, sheep, hogs, goats, fowl, stores, plants and a piano (!) and you have some idea of the voyage to Australia!  It is a testament to the bravery and fortitude of the Captain and crews that the Fleet arrived intact and finally gained the shelter of Sydney Cove on 26th January 1788.

HMS Sirius (511 tons, 110 ft 5 in [33.7 m] x 32 ft 9 in [9.98 m]) was one of two naval ships in the First Fleet, the other being the older and smaller, but faster, HMS Supply (175 tons). (In November 1787 at Cape Town Arthur Phillip transferred from HMS Sirius to the faster HMS Supply.) The rest of the fleet was made up of nine privately owned merchant vessels, making eleven vessels in total.

After leaving England with the rest of the fleet on 13 May 1787, stopping at Santa Cruz at Tenerife, Rio de Janeiro in Brazil, Cape Town in South Africa, rounding the base of Tasmania and then travelling north up the east coast of Australia, HMS Sirius arrived in Botany Bay on 21 January 1788 to join some of the ships that had arrived just days earlier. The whole fleet then transferred north to Sydney Cove in Port Jackson on 26 January 1788. After completing their duties the nine merchant ships sailed back to England, and only HMS Sirius and HMS Supply remained in the colony.

The next voyage of HMS Sirius, with Hibbs aboard, began on 2 October 1788 and lasted more than seven months until 8 May 1789. This was a voyage to Cape Town to get much needed flour and other supplies for the Colony of New South Wales. Leaving Cape Town in January 1789, this voyage was a complete circumnavigation of the globe in an easterly direction. As a result Hibbs was a crewman aboard the first ship to circumnavigate the globe in Antarctic latitudes. The ship travelled from Sydney, past Cape Horn at the base of South America, over to Cape Town, rounding the Cape of Good Hope near the base of South Africa, rounding the base of Tasmania, and then sailing back to Sydney. This route, taking advantage of the strong westerly winds of the Roaring Forties and the Furious Fifties made faster time in a sailing ship than the more direct, shorter by distance, westerly route from Sydney to Cape Town which fought against the winds. To make the distance travelled as short as possible (the infant Colony of New South Wales was starving and it was imperative that HMS Sirius return with supplies in the shortest possible time) the master, John Hunter, ordered the ship south into Antarctic latitudes, running terrible risks with ice-bergs. Ice-bergs did not endanger the ship, but the trip was not to be without incident. A gale near Tasmania on the last leg of the journey nearly drove the ship ashore, smashed the ship's figurehead and badly damaged the front of the ship. Only the endurance of the master, John Hunter, and his exhausted and scurvy afflicted crew saved the ship from destruction.VHR May (2010),Governor John Hunter, Australia and Flinders , Mosman Library, Retrieved 21 February 2013

As a result of the damage to the ship during the trip to Cape Town, HMS Sirius was careened in Mosman Bay on its return to Sydney.

During the time that HMS Sirius was careened, in June 1789, Governor Arthur Phillip lead an expedition which resulted in the discovery of the Hawkesbury River. From stories that his father had told him, Hibbs' son, Peter Kenney Hibbs Junior, claimed that Hibbs was chosen by Governor Arthur Phillip as a crewman for this expedition, and at that time Hibbs "took a fancy to a piece of land" that he was later granted. There is no primary independent evidence to verify these claims.

The wreck of HMS Sirius, 19 March 1790
In March 1790 HMS Sirius, with a crew of about 130 including Hibbs, and HMS Supply, sailed to Norfolk Island, 1000 nautical miles from Sydney, to drop off four companies of marines, over 180 male and female convicts, 27 children, livestock and supplies for the settlement there. An unplanned export for the island was a pair of rock plover pigeons aboard HMS Sirius which established the colony of pigeons still found on the island today. After unloading the marines, convicts and children, bad weather made getting the supplies ashore impossible. Four days later Captain John Hunter tried to land the supplies on HMS Sirius in Sydney Bay. The ship drifted too far into the bay and was wrecked on a reef on 19 March. Attempts were made to get the ship off the reef but these proved futile. It was eventually decided to abandon the ship, and all of the crew made it to shore. To rescue the crew a rope was fastened to a barrel and floated ashore and then fastened to a pine tree that allowed the men to scramble to land. The ship was now empty apart from some surviving livestock. Two convicts volunteered to swim out and release the animals. These two convicts then became drunk on rum left aboard the ship and set fire to the ship, which had to be extinguished by a marine who swam out to the wreck. Fortunately, all goods that were presumed to float had previously been thrown overboard but much was lost on the reef or the shoreline over the next two weeks where some were looted. The supplies that could not float were still aboard the wreck, and over the next two years the ship was stripped for wood, hardware, and supplies until the remains of the ship were down to the waterline.

On 24 March 1790 HMS Supply sailed back to Sydney with news of the wreck carrying but 22 of the crew from HMS Sirius. The rest of the crew, including Hibbs, were left on the island.

The situation on the island was now critical, with 400 extra mouths to feed, many of the supplies from HMS Sirius lost or not immediately accessible, and the supplies from HMS Supply not having been able to be landed. Hibbs took part in salvage operations, whenever the tide and weather permitted, as the only means of obtaining some of those needed supplies. An extract from a letter sent by a non-commissioned officer on HMS Sirius dated August 1790 describes the situation: From the time of the wreck to the latter end of April, we never let slip a single opportunity of working the Ship and by the 10th of the above month had preserved the under mentioned quantity of provisions which was all we had to depend upon and our sanguine Expectation of a relief given up until next Season, or by supposition of the supply bringing ships from some European Settlement, which, within the Bounds of probability, could not be sooner than six months.

In desperation, the settlers began to take for food the local Mount Pitt birds, christened the "Providence" petrel. The settlers took so many that the bird became extinct on Norfolk Island.  The non-commissioned officer on HMS Sirius further described in his letter of August 1790: The Birds come to the island about the middle of March and, by the middle of April, eggs were plentiful. It would be impossible for me to give an account of the number of birds and eggs...by the middle of May to the beginning of June there was no scarcity in any part of the Town and were bartered at a very cheap rate. On the 19th April, the Birds became so very plentiful (and our Store so lean) the Governor issued out a condition that if every person would give up half a pound of his salt meat they might kill and bring home as many birds as he pleased (as long as it did not interfere with their Work)…It is worthy of remark that these birds were coming in when our sad and melancholy Catastrophe happened and were very scarce at the arrival of the relief.

Even though in the meantime the outgoing Justinian and Surprize from the Second Fleet were able to visit the island with some supplies to avert absolute starvation, it was February 1791, 11 months after the wreck, before a ship was able to be sent to Norfolk Island to carry most of the crew back to Sydney. Hibbs stayed on the island. A letter from Lieutenant-Governor Robert Ross to Governor Arthur Phillip carried on that ship describes the conditions on Norfolk Island from the time of the wreck until the date of the letter: with respect to necessaries, not one of them [the detachment under my command] have a shoe to their feet, nor scarce a shirt to their backs; their situation at this juncture is truly deplorable, both men and women having lost almost everything by the wreck of the Sirius …The troops are also in great want of cooking utensils; there are but a few small pots among them all, which have been saved from the wreck of the Sirius...there is not a pot for every twelve men.(Letter of) Ross to Phillip, 11 February 1791, Historical Records of New South Wales, 1:2 p.297

Following the wrecking Captain John Hunter faced a court-martial in England. As no fault could be found in Captain Hunter or any other officers on board when she struck the reef an honourable discharge was given. Captain John Hunter was next made Governor of the young Colony of New South Wales when Arthur Phillip returned to England in late 1792.

Life on Norfolk Island, 1790-1804
Being wrecked on Norfolk Island on 19 March 1790 began a new chapter in the life of Peter Hibbs. He first had to endure a perilous rescue scrambling along a rope to the shore, but he had an advantage that many other seamen did not have as he could swim. He then shared in the deprivations of the other settlers in the island, and his next months were spent in salvage operations to alleviate their common plight.

In early August 1790 the Second Fleet convict transport the Surprize arrived at Norfolk Island carrying 150 female and 35 male convicts, and some supplies, for the little colony on Norfolk Island. Among these convicts was Mary Pardoe. Mary had been convicted of theft and sentenced to seven years transportation on 2 April 1788 at the Warwick Assizes. Her age was given as 18 on the 1789 embarkation list for the Second Fleet transport Lady Juliana. With Mary was her baby daughter Ann who had been born aboard the Lady Juliana in the days before it had anchored in Port Jackson on 6 June 1790 after a voyage of 10 months. Ann, christened in Sydney on 20 June 1790, had been fathered by a seaman aboard the Lady Juliana, Edward Scott, who had been sent back with his ship on 25 July 1790. Mary Pardoe was sent to Norfolk Island as a single mother. Mary was soon in a relationship with Peter Hibbs, and Ann was given his surname and raised as his daughter. In the 1806 muster of New South Wales Mary Pardoe is recorded as the "wife of P.Hibbs", a fact that is confirmed in later censuses. It is therefore assumed that Peter Hibbs, about 10 years older than his bride, married Mary Pardoe in November 1791 when Rev. Richard Johnson visited Norfolk Island for three weeks and married many couples (no records were kept). Nine months earlier, in February 1791, when many of the crew from HMS Sirius had been taken off the island back to Sydney, Hibbs instead stayed on the island to be with Mary.

In about 1791 (Mollie Gillen records the date as 16 May 1791, and another source records the date as 3 January 1792) Hibbs received a 60 acre grant of land on Norfolk island on the south side of the Cascade Run, Phillipsburg, 13 acres hilly and 47 acres level, but all ploughable. Hibbs soon had 9 acres under cultivation. In October 1793 Hibbs sold half of his 60 acres to Aaron Davis for £30, but was still able to sell grain to the government stores in 1794.Peter Hibbs - Of the First Fleet , Retrieved 21 February 2013

In 1792 Mary gave birth to Peter Hibbs' first son, George, named after Hibbs' father. George was to be followed by Peter in 1794 who did not survive his infancy, and Peter Kenney Hibbs Junior in 1800. These three boys were all born on Norfolk Island. Mary and the children moved to Sydney on the mainland to live in January 1804 (some accounts say 1802, which does not agree with other documentation), with their son William being born at sea on-route between Norfolk Island and Sydney.

Before moving his family to the mainland, however, Hibbs used his experience at sea to be appointed master of a colonial built vessel. Using timber from the island, and timber and other hardware items that had been salvaged from the wreck of HMS Sirius, Hibbs had helped to build the 25-ton decked sloop Norfolk that was completed in 1798 on the orders of Captain Townson, the commanding officer of the island. Built with the aim of establishing regular contact between Norfolk Island and Sydney, Hibbs sailed the Norfolk to Sydney in June 1798 with a crew of men from the island. The boat was immediately confiscated as there was a law against boat-building. The governor wanted to give no opportunities to convicts to steal a boat and escape from the colony. The colony was also, however, short of vessels for exploration and trade. Straight after the ship was confiscated by Governor Hunter, Hibbs' previous master of HMS Sirius, placed Hibbs back in charge of the Norfolk and gave him job of taking Matthew Flinders and George Bass on a voyage to discover if Tasmania was an island in 1798-99, and then later in 1799 of taking Matthew Flinders on a voyage to survey Moreton Bay and Hervey Bay.HM Colonial Sloop Norfolk , Access date 21 February 2013

In October 1800, while the ship was being used to carry locally grown produce from the Windsor area on the Hawkesbury River to Port Jackson (Sydney), the Norfolk was wrecked after being hijacked by convicts. Hibbs was no longer the master of the ship at the time, however, as by September 1800 he was listed as being "in care of His Majesty's Ship Supply". Hibbs, as Quarter Master & Masters Mate, then joined the armed vessel HMS Porpoise in 1801. Mollie Gillen records that serving with Hibbs on HMS Porpoise was his young son George. Hibbs was discharged from HMS Porpoise at Sydney in August 1803.

Life on the mainland, 1804-1847
To support his family Hibbs became a part-owner of the Trimmer, a small 20 ton sloop, which he sailed between Sydney and the Hawkesbury River, servicing the farms established there.

On 11 August 1804 (Mollie Gillen records the date as September 1803) Hibbs was granted 100 acres at Mulgrave Place, on the Hawkesbury River, where he established his growing family. His young son George was granted the adjoining 100 acres. This farm, situate upon the first branch of the river, and bounded upon both sides by the water found on the south side of the Hawkesbury River, to which it has on extensive frontage of about two miles, then became known as "Hibbs' Farm" even after Hibbs no longer owned it.LOT 4. An excellent farm , The Sydney Monitor, 31 March 1830, Retrieved 21 February 2013

In the 1806 muster of New South Wales Hibbs is recorded as farming a 100 acre grant "down the river", with 10 acres under wheat, 6 acres under corn, 1 acre under barley, ½ acre in orchard/garden, 74½ acres under pasture (or uncleared), and 8 acres fallow. He is also recorded as having 3 male goats, 6 female goats, 6 male hogs, 6 female hogs, and 3 bushells of maize in hand. The persons on the farm are recorded as Hibbs, Mary, 5 children and 2 convict labourers, all not victualled by the government. His eldest son George, only 14 years old, is shown as farming a 100 acre grant all in pasture (or uncleared). One of the other 5 children recorded was his step-daughter Ann, who before 1809 married the convict John Izard who had arrived on the Perseus in 1802. The other 3 children were Peter Jnr, William, and Sarah. His wife Mary is also recorded separately as Mary Pardoe, wife of P Hibbs.

On 26 January 1808 a military coup took over the government of New South Wales from the then Governor, William Bligh. Hibbs was spared the foreclosures on loans suffered by many of Bligh's supporters, and "...appears to have had two bob three ways...", having signed petitions both supporting and opposing the usurpers.

Hibbs was frequently before the courts for debts to his creditors. The first occasion was on 26 March 1810 for owing money to Henry Kable Jnr. As a result an order was made against Hibbs and "A Quantity of Houshold Furniture, a few Pigs and Goats, and other Effects,...Two Stacks of Wheat and about Four Hundred Bushels of Bread Corn" belonging to Hibbs was sold by the Provoct Marshall at public auction on 17 May 1810. Hibbs was next before the courts on 24 July 1812 for owing money to Thomas Brady, and on 28 October 1812 for owing money to Mary Reibey. As a result in October 1812 Hibbs sold his 100 acre grant at Mulgrave Place to Mary Reibey for £100.To be let or sold , Sydney Gazette, 17 April 1813, Retrieved 21 February 2013 However he again found himself before the courts on 30 April 1814 for owing money to Henry Kable Snr.

By 1816 Hibbs was owner of the small sloop Recovery, which he sailed between Sydney and the Hawkesbury River, servicing the farms established there. The Sydney Gazette newspaper of 6 July 1816 carried the account of the wreck of this vessel:The Recovery, Peter Hibbs owner, on her passage from Hawkesbury with grain about a month since, was blown out to sea, and at length wrecked near Port Stevens due to tempestuous weather.
Hibbs next had to walk with his crew, his son George, and his female passenger along the coast about 80 kilometres to the nearest settlement at Newcastle, but on the way they were stripped of their clothing by natives and exposed to the Winter weather:The crew, two men accompanied by a woman, walked in to Newcastle, which is a distance of about fifty miles, keeping by the sea coast. On their distressing journey they unfortunately encountered a horde of natives, who stripped them of their clothing, and left them to the rigours of an inclement season. Their distresses were humanely relieved by the Commandant of Newcastle;Having obtained passage on the sloop Windsor back to Sydney, Hibbs, George and his passenger were again wrecked at Long Reef (near Collaroy Beach) and again had to walk along the coast with the crew and other passengers of the Windsor until able to obtain a further passage to Sydney, there being none of the modern bridges across Port Jackson that today would have allowed them to walk all the way:and obtaining a passage for Sydney in another small vessel, the sloop Windsor, of about twenty two tons burthen, belonging to Henry Major, were again cast away, this vessel having been unfortunately wrecked upon the Long Reef, from whence they walked in.In 1821 Hibbs received another grant of 60 acres of land at Courangra Point at Haycock Reach, Hawkesbury River.Continuation of Land, The Sydney Monitor, 14 January 1834, Retrieved 21 February 2013 The deed for this land was, however, not registered until 30 June 1823.Mr Blackman on Monday 12 December , The Sydney Herald, 16 November 1841, Retrieved 21 February 2013 This was land that Hibbs had already been permitted to occupy. Hibbs, illiterate, had previously had a Memorial written for him requesting ownership of this land. In this Memorial dated 30 June 1820 Hibbs stated that he had arrived on HMS Sirius, had been Quarter Master and Master's Mate on HMS Porpoise, had a wife and 7 children, and had already built a home and had sewn 14 acres in wheat.

In 1821 his son Peter Kenney Hibbs Jnr also received a grant of land having requested the same on 28 June 1820 stating in his Memorial that he had reached the age of 21, when he had not in fact yet reached that age. Both Peter Hibbs Snr and Peter Hibbs Jnr became entitled to receive a further grant of land in 1825.

In the 1822 muster of New South Wales Hibbs, Peter Jnr and William are all shown as Landholders in the district of Windsor. His wife Mary is recorded as Mary Pardo, employed by P Hibbs, Windsor.

In 1824 Hibbs, "Of Lower Branch, Hawkesbury; mariner" was on a list of persons liable to serve as jurors in the District of Windsor.

In the 1825 muster of New South Wales Hibbs is shown as a Landholder in the district of Wilberforce. His sons Peter Jnr, William, Richard and Joseph are also shown with their ages accurately recorded. His wife Mary is recorded as Mary Pardo, wife of P Hibbs, Wilberforce.

In the 1828 Census of New South Wales Hibbs is shown as farming 60 acres, with 18 acres being cleared and cultivated, in the district of Lower Portland Head. Ages recorded in this Census are Hibbs - 64, Mary - 56, George - 34, Peter Jnr - 26, William - 24, Richard - 21, and Joseph - 19. Only the age for William is recorded correctly.

On 21 February 1832 Hibbs sold his 60 acres of land at Courangra Point to Thomas Edwards for £15. This grant was later described at a subsequent sale as:sixty acres more or less, situate, lying, and being, in the county of Cumberland and district of Castlereagh, bounded on the north, east and west sides by the HAWKESBURY RIVER, and on the south side by mountains''

Hibbs' wife Mary died on 19 May 1844. Hibbs survived her by 3 years. On 12 September 1847, aged 90 years, Hibbs died at Pumpkin (Creek) Point on the Hawkesbury River, where his step-son-in-law John (aka Joseph) Izard owned an acre of land. Both Peter Hibbs and his wife Mary are buried in the Wisemans Ferry Cemetery at Laughtondale, an area that was then known as Lower Portland Head.

References

1750s births
1847 deaths
People from Ramsgate
First Fleet